Jean-François "J.F." Jenny-Clark (12 July 1944 in Toulouse, France – 6 October 1998 in Paris) was a French double bass player. He was estimated as one of the most important bass players of European jazz.

Together with drummer Aldo Romano he provided the rhythm section for Don Cherry's European quintet of 1965, recorded with Steve Lacy and performed concerts with Keith Jarrett (around 1970) and for Jasper van 't Hof's group Pork Pie (with Charlie Mariano) (around 1975).

As a member of Diego Massons ensemble Musique Vivante he was interpreting contemporary music compositions by John Cage, Luciano Berio, Mauricio Kagel, Karlheinz Stockhausen, Pierre Boulez, or Vinko Globokar.

Together with Albert Mangelsdorff he led the German-French jazz ensemble, 1984 to 1987. Since 1985 Jenny-Clark was mainly working in an acclaimed trio with German pianist Joachim Kühn and Swiss drummer Daniel Humair.

Discography

References

French jazz double-bassists
Male double-bassists
Classical double-bassists
1944 births
1998 deaths
Musicians from Toulouse
20th-century classical musicians
20th-century French musicians
20th-century double-bassists
20th-century French male musicians
French male jazz musicians